George Russell Hegamin (born February 14, 1973) is a former American football offensive lineman in the National Football League (NFL) for the Dallas Cowboys, Philadelphia Eagles, and Tampa Bay Buccaneers. He played college football at North Carolina State University.

Early years
Hegamin started to play organized football as a junior at Camden High School in Camden, New Jersey. He received All-American honorable-mention and first-team All-state honors, as a senior defensive tackle.

He accepted a football scholarship from North Carolina State University, where he was converted into an offensive tackle. As a redshirt freshman in 1992, he won the right tackle starting job and received freshman All-American and second-team All-ACC honors.

In 1993, he was platooned at right tackle with Scott Woods and was a part of an offensive line that surrendered only 14 sacks (third lowest in school history). At the end of the season, he bypassed his final two years of college to enter the NFL draft, in order to help his mother, who was diagnosed with cancer.

Professional career

Dallas Cowboys
Hegamin was selected by the Dallas Cowboys in the third-round (102nd overall) of the 1994 NFL Draft, and was the largest player picked in the draft. As a rookie, he was de-activated for the first seven games of the season. He appeared in three contests, before being de-activated for the rest of the regular season and the playoffs.

The next year, he appeared in the season opener, before being declared inactive for the next 12 games. With injuries along the offensive line, he was active but didn't play in the final three contests of the regular season. He was a part of the Super Bowl XXX championship team.

In 1996, he was allocated to the Frankfurt Galaxy of the World League of American Football, where he was a starter at right tackle and earned All-World honors. With the departure of Ron Stone in free agency, he was used as the Cowboys top backup for the offensive line. He had his first start, while filling-in for an injured Mark Tuinei in the season finale against the Washington Redskins.

In his first years in the league, he saw little action as a backup of arguably some of the best offensive lines in NFL history. In 1997, with the offensive line beginning to show its age, he started a total of nine games while replacing injured starters. Seven starts in place of Mark Tuinei at left tackle and two at left guard in place of Nate Newton. Although he was solid at run blocking, he didn't have the agility needed for pass blocking, so the Cowboys replaced him at left tackle with Larry Allen in passing downs situations.

Philadelphia Eagles
On February 19, 1998, he signed a four-year contract as a free agent with the Philadelphia Eagles. The Eagles used him at right guard, where he started six games.

The next year, with the arrival of new head coach Andy Reid, he walked out of training camp for one day, after being told of his demotion in favor of rookie Doug Brzezinski. When he came back, Reid made him push a blocking sled the length of a practice field under the heat, in front of some players, coaches, executives and the media. He eventually was cut on September 4, 1999.

Tampa Bay Buccaneers
On November 10, 1999, he signed with the Tampa Bay Buccaneers and backed up both offensive tackle positions for two seasons. He made two starts during his time with the team, including the 2000 Wild-Card playoff loss against the Philadelphia Eagles, where he was overmatched at left tackle playing against Pro Bowler Hugh Douglas. He was released on September 2, 2001.

Personal life
Hegamin works as the Senior Manager of Players Services for the NFL Players Association. He is also the offensive lineman coach at the Under Armour National Combine and Elite Football Camp. Current OL Coach at IMG Academy in FL.

References

1973 births
Living people
Camden High School (New Jersey) alumni
Players of American football from Camden, New Jersey
American football offensive tackles
NC State Wolfpack football players
Dallas Cowboys players
Frankfurt Galaxy players
Philadelphia Eagles players
Tampa Bay Buccaneers players